Edward Rollins may refer to:

Edward H. Rollins (1824–1889), American politician
Ed Rollins (born 1943), Republican campaign consultant
Edward Rollins (boxer) (1852–1939), Australian middleweight boxer
Edward A. Rollins (1828–1885), Commissioner of Internal Revenue